Kurt Gloor (8 November 1942 – 20 September 1997) was a Swiss film director, screenwriter and producer. He directed eleven films between 1967 and 1992.

His 1976 film The Sudden Loneliness of Konrad Steiner was entered into the 26th Berlin International Film Festival. Five years later, his 1981 film The Inventor was entered into the 31st Berlin International Film Festival. In 1984, his film Man Without Memory was entered into the 34th Berlin International Film Festival.

He committed suicide shortly after completing his final film.

Filmography
 Ffft (1967)
 Die Landschaftsgärtner (1969)
 Die grünen Kinder - Filmisch-empirisches Soziogramm (1972)
 Die besten Jahre (1974)
 The Sudden Loneliness of Konrad Steiner (1976)
 Em Lehme si Letscht (1977)
 Der Chinese (1980)
 The Inventor (1981)
 Man Without Memory (1984)
 William Tell (1992)

References

External links

1942 births
1997 suicides
German-language film directors
Swiss film directors
Swiss screenwriters
Male screenwriters
Swiss film producers
20th-century screenwriters
Suicides in Switzerland